Stephanie Bond (born 16 May 1981 in Dargaville, New Zealand) is a New Zealand netball player. She played two years in the ANZ Championship for the Northern Mystics from 2008–09, but was not signed for the 2010 season, due to time restraints with her law career.

Prior to the ANZ Championship, Bond spent time with both the Auckland Diamonds (2006-2007) and Otago Rebels (2001-2005) in the National Bank Cup.

In 2012, she was called up into the Southern Steel for a game as cover for the injured Sheryl Scanlan.

References

New Zealand netball players
Northern Mystics players
ANZ Championship players
Living people
1981 births
People from Dargaville
Auckland Diamonds players
Southern Steel players
Otago Rebels players